Richard Potts (1753–1808) was a U.S. Senator from Maryland from 1793 to 1796. Senator Potts may also refer to:

Andrew R. Potts (1853–1932), Wisconsin State Senate
Benjamin F. Potts (1836–1887), Ohio State Senate
Frederic A. Potts (1836–1888), New Jersey State Senate
Russ Potts (born 1939), Virginia State Senate
Tony Potts (politician) (born 1970s), Idaho State Senate